Conchita Martínez and Arantxa Sánchez Vicario were the defending champions but they competed with different partners that year, Martínez with Jelena Dokić and Sánchez Vicario with Martina Navratilova.

Navratilova and Sánchez Vicario lost in the second round to Lubomira Bacheva and Åsa Carlsson.

Dokić and Martínez lost in the semifinals to Cara Black and Elena Likhovtseva.

Els Callens and Meghann Shaughnessy won in the final 6–4, 6–3 against Black and Likhovtseva.

Seeds
Champion seeds are indicated in bold text while text in italics indicates the round in which those seeds were eliminated. The top four seeded teams received byes into the second round.

Draw

Final

Top half

Bottom half

References
 2001 European Ladies German Open Doubles Draw

WTA German Open
2001 WTA Tour